The Green–Kubo relations (Melville S. Green 1954, Ryogo Kubo 1957) give the exact mathematical expression for transport coefficients  in terms of integrals of time correlation functions:

Thermal and mechanical transport processes

Thermodynamic systems may be prevented from relaxing to equilibrium because of the application of a field (e.g. electric or magnetic field), or because the boundaries of the system are in relative motion (shear) or maintained at different temperatures, etc. This generates two classes of nonequilibrium system: mechanical nonequilibrium systems and thermal nonequilibrium systems.

The standard example of an electrical transport process is Ohm's law, which states that, at least for sufficiently small applied voltages, the current I is linearly proportional to the applied voltage V,

As the applied voltage increases one expects to see deviations from linear behavior. The coefficient of proportionality is the electrical conductance which is the reciprocal of the electrical resistance.

The standard example of a mechanical transport process is Newton's law of viscosity, which states that the shear stress  is linearly proportional to the strain rate. The strain rate  is the rate of change streaming velocity in the x-direction, with respect to the y-coordinate, . Newton's law of viscosity states

As the strain rate increases we expect to see deviations from linear behavior

Another well known thermal transport process is Fourier's law of heat conduction, stating that the heat flux between two bodies maintained at different temperatures is proportional to the temperature gradient (the temperature difference divided by the spatial separation).

Linear constitutive relation

Regardless of whether transport processes are stimulated thermally or mechanically, in the small field limit it is expected that a flux will be linearly proportional to an applied field. In the linear case the flux and the force are said to be conjugate to each other. The relation between a thermodynamic force F and its conjugate thermodynamic flux J is called a linear constitutive relation,

L(0) is called a linear transport coefficient. In the case of multiple forces and fluxes acting simultaneously, the fluxes and forces will be related by a linear transport coefficient matrix. Except in special cases, this matrix is symmetric as expressed in the Onsager reciprocal relations.

In the 1950s Green and Kubo proved an exact expression for linear transport coefficients which is valid for systems of arbitrary temperature T, and density. They proved that linear transport coefficients are exactly related to the time dependence of equilibrium fluctuations in the conjugate flux,

where  (with k the Boltzmann constant), and V is the system volume. The integral is over the equilibrium flux autocovariance function. At zero time the autocovariance is positive since it is the mean square value of the flux at equilibrium.  Note that at equilibrium the mean value of the flux is zero by definition. At long times the flux at time t, J(t), is uncorrelated with its value a long time earlier J(0) and the autocorrelation function decays to zero. This remarkable relation is frequently used in molecular dynamics computer simulation to compute linear transport coefficients; see Evans and Morriss, "Statistical Mechanics of Nonequilibrium Liquids", Academic Press 1990.

Nonlinear response and transient time correlation functions

In 1985 Denis Evans and Morriss derived two exact fluctuation expressions for nonlinear transport coefficients—see Evans and Morriss in Mol. Phys, 54, 629(1985).  Evans later argued that these are consequences of the extremization of free energy in Response theory as a free energy minimum.

Evans and Morriss proved that in a thermostatted system that is at equilibrium at t = 0, the nonlinear transport coefficient can be calculated from the so-called transient time correlation function expression:

where the equilibrium flux autocorrelation function is replaced by a thermostatted field dependent transient autocorrelation function. At time zero  but at later times since the field is applied .

Another exact fluctuation expression derived by Evans and Morriss is the so-called Kawasaki expression for the nonlinear response:

The ensemble average of the right hand side of the Kawasaki expression is to be evaluated under the application of both the thermostat and the external field.  At first sight the transient time correlation function (TTCF) and Kawasaki expression might appear to be of limited use—because of their innate complexity.  However, the TTCF is quite useful in computer simulations for calculating transport coefficients. Both expressions can be used to derive new and useful fluctuation expressions quantities like specific heats, in nonequilibrium steady states.  Thus they can be used as a kind of partition function for nonequilibrium steady states.

Derivation from the fluctuation theorem and the central limit theorem 
For a thermostatted steady state, time integrals of the dissipation function are related to the dissipative flux, J, by the equation

We note in passing that the long time average of the dissipation function is a product of the thermodynamic force and the average conjugate thermodynamic flux.  It is therefore equal to the spontaneous entropy production in the system. The spontaneous entropy production plays a key role in linear irreversible thermodynamics – see de Groot and Mazur  "Non-equilibrium thermodynamics" Dover.

The fluctuation theorem (FT) is valid for arbitrary averaging times, t. Let's apply the FT in the long time limit while simultaneously reducing the field so that the product  is held constant,

Because of the particular way we take the double limit, the negative of the mean value of the flux remains a fixed number of standard deviations away from the mean as the averaging time increases (narrowing the distribution) and the field decreases. This means that as the averaging time gets longer the distribution near the mean flux and its negative, is accurately described by the central limit theorem.  This means that the distribution is Gaussian near the mean and its negative so that

Combining these two relations yields (after some tedious algebra!) the exact Green–Kubo relation for the linear zero field transport coefficient, namely,

Here are the details of the proof of Green–Kubo relations from the FT.
A proof using only elementary quantum mechanics was given by Zwanzig.

Summary

This shows the fundamental importance of the fluctuation theorem (FT) in nonequilibrium statistical mechanics.
The FT gives a generalisation of the second law of thermodynamics. It is then easy to prove the second law inequality and the Kawasaki identity. When combined with the central limit theorem, the FT also implies the Green–Kubo relations for linear transport coefficients close to equilibrium. The FT is, however, more general than the Green–Kubo Relations because, unlike them, the FT applies to fluctuations far from equilibrium. In spite of this fact, no one has yet been able to derive the equations for nonlinear response theory from the FT.

The FT does not imply or require that the distribution of time-averaged dissipation is Gaussian.  There are many examples known when the distribution is non-Gaussian and yet the FT still correctly describes the probability ratios.

See also

Density matrix
Fluctuation theorem
Fluctuation–dissipation theorem
Green's function (many-body theory)
Lindblad equation
Linear response function

References

 
 

Theoretical physics
Thermodynamic equations
Statistical mechanics
Non-equilibrium thermodynamics